Pic de Finestrelles is a mountain located in the Oriental Pyrenees, on the border of France and Spain.

This peak is notable for being the mountain from which the world record for the most distant photographed landscape on Earth was taken. The view included the Massif of Ecrins (French Alps). The mountains were photographed at dawn on 16 July 2016 by Marc Bret. The furthest point in the shot was Pic Gaspard, 443km away. Bret used a Panasonic Lumix FZ72 with 1200mm zoom.

See also
Pyrenees
Beyond horizons

References

Mountains of Catalonia
Mountains of the Pyrenees